Martin Kližan and David Marrero were the defending champions, but Kližan chose not to participate this year and Marrero chose to compete in Båstad instead.

Guillermo Durán and Andrés Molteni won the title, defeating Marin and Tomislav Draganja in the final, 6–3, 6–7(4–7), [10–6].

Seeds

Draw

Draw

References
 Main Draw

Croatia Open
Croatia Open Umag – Doubles
Croatia Open Umag – Doubles